Bremervörde is a railway station in northwestern Germany. It is owned and operated by EVB, with regular trains on the Bremerhaven–Buxtehude railway. The Moorexpress heritage service also calls at the station on summer weekends.

The station was modernised for a total amount of € 340,000 in 2006 and features a travel agency and a bistro. It is a non-smoking station and equipped with a CCTV system.

Train services
The station is served by the following services:

Local services  Cuxhaven - Bremerhaven - Bremervörde - Buxtehude

References 

Railway stations in Lower Saxony
Eisenbahnen und Verkehrsbetriebe Elbe-Weser